A wight (Old English: wiht) is a mythical sentient being, often undead. 

In its original use the word wight described a living human being, but has come to be used in fictional works in the fantasy genre to describe certain immortal beings. An example of this use occurs in William Morris's translation of the Grettis Saga, where haugbui is translated as "barrow-wight". Wights also feature in J. R. R. Tolkien's world of Middle-earth, especially in The Lord of the Rings, and in George R. R. Martin's novel series A Song of Ice and Fire and HBO television series Game of Thrones. Since its 1974 inclusion in the RPG Dungeons & Dragons (D&D), it has become a recurring form of undead in other fantasy games and mods, such as Vampire: The Masquerade. and The Elder Scrolls V: Skyrim.

Examples in classic English literature and poetry

 Geoffrey Chaucer
 The Reeve's Tale, (1387–1400), line 4236:
 "For [Aleyn] had swonken al the longe nyght, 
 And seyde, 'Fare weel, Malyne, sweete wight!'"
 The Monk's Tale, (1387–1400), line 380:
 "She kept her maidenhood from every wight
 To no man deigned she for to be bond."
The Book of the Duchess, (1387–1400), line 579:
 "Worste of alle wightes."
 Prologue of The Knight, (1387–1400), line 72–73:
 "Ne neuere yet no vileynye he sayde
 In al his lyf vnto no manere wight.
 He was a verray parfit gentil knyght."
 The House of Fame, (1379–1380), line 1830–1831:
 "We ben shrewes, every wight,
 And han delyt in wikkednes."
 Edmund Spenser, The Faerie Queene, (1590–1596), I.i.6.8–9:
 "That every wight to shrowd it did constrain,
 And this fair couple eke to shroud themselues were fain."
 William Shakespeare, The Merry Wives of Windsor, (c. 1602), Act I, Sc. III:
 "O base Hungarian wight! wilt thou the spigot wield?
 William Shakespeare, Othello, (c. 1603), Act II, Sc. I:
 "She was a wight, if ever such wight were"
 John Milton, On the Death of a Fair Infant Dying of a Cough, (1626), verse vi:
 "Oh say me true if thou wert mortal wight..."
 Church of Scotland, Scots Metrical Psalter, (1650), Psalm 18 verse xxvi:
 "froward thou kythst unto the froward wight..."
William Wordsworth, "To the Daisy" (1802) line 28:
 Whole Summer-fields are thine by right;
 And Autumn, melancholy wight!
 Doth in thy crimson head delight
  When rains are on thee.
 John Keats, "La Belle Dame Sans Merci", (1820):
 Ah what can ail thee, wretched wight,
 Alone and palely loitering;
 Washington Irving, The Legend of Sleepy Hollow (1820):
 "In this by-place of nature there abode, in a remote period of American history, that is to say, some thirty years since, a worthy wight of the name of Ichabod Crane, who sojourned, or, as he expressed it, "tarried," in Sleepy Hollow, for the purpose of instructing the children of the vicinity."
 George Gordon, Lord Byron (1812–1816), Childe Harold's Pilgrimage Canto 1, verse :
 Ah, me! in sooth he was a shamles wight ...".
 Edwin Greenslade Murphy, "Wot Won the Larst?", in Dryblower’s Verses, (1926):
 From weedy little wights whose cigarettes 	
 Recall a badly-disinfected drain
 W.S. Gilbert, "Princess Ida", (1883), a song sung by the character King Gama: 
 "Now when a wight sits up all night, ill natured jokes devising,and all his wiles are met with smiles, it's hard, there's no disguising!"

German Wicht
A similar change of meaning can be seen in the German cognate Wicht, meaning a living human being, generally rather small, poor or miserable man (not woman). The word is somewhat old-fashioned in today's language, but it is still used and readily recognized in everyday speech.  

The diminutive Wichtel refers to beings in folklore and fantasy, generally small, and often helpful, dwelling in or near human settlements, secretly doing work and helping the humans, somewhat similar to the more specific Heinzelmännchen. Wichtel in this sense is recorded since the Middle Ages. Today, Wichtel is more often used than Wicht.

Dutch wicht
The word wicht can be used to refer, in a neutral way, to any woman. It is not used to refer to men.

Booswicht (literally Evil – Being) matching 'villain', can be used to describe both men and women.

See also
 Jiangshi
 Vættir

References

Anglo-Saxon paganism
English legendary creatures
Scandinavian folklore
Corporeal undead